The Generali Deyna Cup was a two-day association football tournament that featured four teams. It was played at the Polish Army Stadium in Warsaw, Poland. This tournament was dedicated to Kazimierz Deyna.

The only edition was organised in 2013. It was not continued due to financial reasons.

Participating teams

Competition format

References

2013 in Brazilian football
2013–14 in Serbian football
2013–14 in Austrian football
2013–14 in Polish football
International club association football competitions hosted by Poland